Menace in Europe: Why the Continent's Crisis Is America's, Too is a book by Claire Berlinski about problems and challenges facing Europe, and the consequences of Europe's failure to meet these challenges. Among the phenomena addressed in the book are Muslim integration (and the lack thereof), anti-Americanism, antisemitism, and Europe's often forgotten violent history.

Reception
The book has been cited several times as a segment of "Eurabia literature".

Positive
Norah Vincent, a former Los Angeles Times columnist: One of the wisest and most compulsively readable public intellectuals writing today, Berlinski presents a work of Orwellian foresight and Churchillian conviction that will tear a welcome hole in our complacency and teach us to rethink our political future. 
Michael Medved: Chilling, persuasive, and urgent. Most Americans prefer to think of ‘The Old World’ as charming, quaint, and irrelevant, but Berlinski shows why all of us need to worry about the harrowing dangers facing European civilization.
New Oxford Review:  One can't read [Menace in Europe] and walk away optimistic about the future of Europe.

Mixed
The New York Sun: It's hard to do full justice to the rich material in [Menace in Europe]. Ms. Berlinski...has a fascinating chapter on the Nazi aesthetic of Rammstein, Germany's most popular band. But if [Menace in Europe has] any weaknesses it is the lack of a historical framework.

Unfavorable

Washington Times: "What worries me about books like this is that they risk reducing Europe to a caricature in much the same way as Stupid White Men turns America into one big Wal-Mart with drive-by shootings."

National Review: Her observation that there is nothing Americans can do to change [Europe], "short of dying politely en masse," suggests that Ms. Berlinski, a lively writer always happy to hype up the snark and the spark of her prose, is taking her readers not to France, or Germany, but to Planet Coulter.
Baltimore Chronicle & Sentinel: A better example of the essential emptiness of neo-conservatism than Claire Berlinski's Menace in Europe would be difficult to find...ugly vituperation expressed in sweeping generalizations...Berlinski cherry-picks her evidence.

Notes

Further reading
  

 (Reprint of portions of the same article)

External links

Political books
Late modern Europe
Books about Europe
2006 non-fiction books
Eurabia
Three Rivers Press books